Nilukshi Fernando (born April 19, 1984) is a Sri Lankan actress. She made her debut as a teenager in Vasanthi Chathurani's Sadgunakaraya in 2007. She was crowned most upcoming actress for her performance in this teledrama, at the Rajya Sammana Ulela that year. Her most acclaimed role in the small screen was that of 'Sandesi' in 'Sanda' opposite Pathum Rukshan in 2013. She was crowned Raigam Best Actress Award for her performance in this teledrama, at the 10th Raigam Tele Award Festival that year.

Latest teledramas 
 Seya - Swarnavahini
 Eran landu - Rupavahini

References

Living people
1984 births
Sri Lankan film actresses
Sinhalese actresses
Sri Lankan television actresses